Anin is a surname. Notable people with the surname include:

 Ante Anin (born 3 February 1966), German architect
 Kévin Anin (born 5 July 1986), French former professional footballer
 Lucy Anin (born 13 June 1939), Ghanaian politician
 Roman Anin (born 16 December 1986), Russian investigative journalist
 T. E. Anin, Ghanaian lawyer

See also 
Anin (disambiguation)